Ina Wood (2 September 1886 – 25 January 1961) was a British archer.  She competed at the 1908 Summer Olympics in London. Wood competed at the 1908 Games in the only archery event open to women, the double National round.  She took 22nd place in the event with 387 points.

References

External links
 
 
Ina Wood's profile at Sports Reference.com

1886 births
1961 deaths
Archers at the 1908 Summer Olympics
Olympic archers of Great Britain
British female archers
20th-century British women